Lentigo pipus, common name : the Elegant Conch,  is a species of Conch sea snail, a marine gastropod mollusk in the family Strombidae, the true conchs.

Description
The shell size varies between 35 mm and 85 mm.

Distribution
This species is distributed in the Indo-West Pacific along the Mascarene Basin and the Philippines.

References

 Walls, J.G. (1980). Conchs, tibias and harps. A survey of the molluscan families Strombidae and Harpidae. T.F.H. Publications Ltd, Hong Kong

External links
 

Strombidae
Gastropods described in 1798